Thomas Wood was a Roman Catholic chaplain to Mary I of England and later a confessor of the Catholic faith. Wood was the last of the Cambridge Franciscans whom occupied the site where Sidney Sussex College was eventually built from 1596. Wood was held in the Tower of London after Mary's death, and threatened with torture. He was later transferred to Marshalsea Prison. He died in Wisbech Castle c.1588.

References

16th-century English Roman Catholic priests
Year of death unknown
Year of birth unknown
Mary I of England
Inmates of the Marshalsea
Prisoners in the Tower of London